The Human World Tour is the second solo concert tour by American recording artist, Brandy. Often acknowledged as the Just Human Tour, the outing supported her fifth studio album, Human. The tour was the singer's first concert tour in nearly ten years and was well received by the public and critics. The tour primarily visited North America and Europe, with a few dates in Asia.

Background
While promoting her recent album, Brandy mentioned in several interviews her hope to tour the album. She felt enthusiastic about returning to the stage and performing for a huge audience. She also mentioned how she wanted to return overseas. During the Fall of 2008, Brandy embarked on a small promotional tour, performing mostly at music festivals. The tour began early in 2009 and ran through to the summer. Taking a cue from the BET special, "Just Human", the singer wanted to perform intimate shows to allow the audience to connect with her. The singer chose to perform in concert hall, theatres and nightclubs versus the usual sports arena. The main goal of the show was to be simplistic and draw a connection to the singer and the audience. During the tour, Brandy performed her hits from previous albums along with a few selections from Human.

Supporting acts
 Colby O'Donis (North America) (select venues)
 Ray J (North America) (select venues)
 Bell X1 (Europe) (select venues)
 Samsaya (Europe) (select venues)

Setlist

Shows

Festivals and other miscellaneous performances

This concert was a part of the Milwaukee Pridefest
This concert was a part of San Jose Pride.
This concert was a part of the Muscogee (Creek) Nation Festival

External links
Official website

References

Brandy Norwood concert tours
2009 concert tours